Ceylonthelphusa venusta is a species of decapod in the family Gecarcinucidae.

The IUCN conservation status of Ceylonthelphusa venusta is "NT", near threatened. The species may be considered threatened in the near future. The IUCN status was reviewed in 2008.

References

Further reading

 

Ceylonthelphusa
Articles created by Qbugbot
Crustaceans described in 1995